The Spin Boldak bombing happened on February 18, 2008 when a car full of explosives detonated near a Canadian military convoy in a market in Spin Boldak, Afghanistan.  The attack killed 38 Afghans and injured at least 25 civilians.  In addition, four Canadian soldiers were lightly injured. 

This suicide bombing occurred just one day after the 2008 Kandahar bombing, the deadliest terrorist attack during the Afghanistan War up until then.

Kandahar Governor Asadullah Khalid said the bombing would not have happened if the Canadians listened to him when he tried to discourage them from going to Spin Boldak.

References

2008 murders in Afghanistan
Mass murder in 2008
Mass murder in Afghanistan
Suicide car and truck bombings in Afghanistan
Terrorist incidents in Afghanistan in 2008
February 2008 events in Asia
February 2008 crimes